Nestegis sandwicensis, commonly known as Hawai'i olive or olopua, is a species of flowering tree in the olive family, Oleaceae, that is endemic to Hawaii.

Uses
Native Hawaiians used the hard wood of olopua to make au koi (adze handles), apuapu (rasps for making fish hooks), ōō (digging sticks), lāau melomelo (fishing lures), pou (house posts), pāhoa (daggers), pīkoi (tripping weapons similar to a rope dart), and spears.  Because the wood burned well even if green, it was used as wahie (firewood).

References

Further reading

External links

 

sandwicensis
Endemic flora of Hawaii
Trees of Hawaii
Biota of Hawaii (island)
Biota of Kauai
Biota of Lanai
Biota of Maui
Biota of Molokai
Biota of Oahu
Plants described in 1862
Flora without expected TNC conservation status